The Federation is an American hip hop group from Fairfield, California. The group was formed in 2002, composed of producer Ricardo "Rick Rock" Thomas and three rappers: Anthony "Goldie Gold" Caldwell, Marvin "Doonie Baby/Doon Koon" Selmon and Thomas "Stressmatic" Jackson. The group released their debut studio album in 2004 on Virgin Records and their sophomore album through Reprise Records in 2007, which is, to date, their recent effort.

History 
Rick Rock and Doonie Baby’s friendship and collaborative work dates back to the early ‘90s in Alabama, where they recorded as two-thirds of the group Cosmic Slop Shop along with Big Lurch. At age 16 and using a wheelchair after being shot, the Nevada-born, Fairfield/Vallejo-raised Federation member Goldie Gold met Rick Rock at a local mall, impressing Rock with his rapping skills. In 2002, Rick Rock recruited Doonie Baby, Goldie Gold, and Mr. Stress to form the group.

The group debuted on Vallejo producer Mike Mosely's 2002 release Major Work: The Soundtrack with the Rick Rock-produced track "The Sickness", which sampled Art of Noise's 1983 song "Moments of Love". Their first single "Hyphy", featuring E-40, debuted in 2003, the title was based on a slang term established by Keak the Sneak in the 90s Bay Area hip hop music. Hyphy became an instant hit in the Bay Area. The song even induced a riot when The Federation performed "Hyphy" during halftime of the AND1 Live Tour at Oracle Arena in June 2004. On the strength of "Hyphy" and their second single "Donkey", the group's self-titled debut album was released under Virgin Records to critical reception. In 2005, Rick Rock signed the group under Reprise Records, releasing the group's follow-up album It's Whateva in the summer of 2007.

In 2009, Stressmatic was featured in an interview in the book How to Rap, along with several other rappers, including E-40, Nelly, Tech N9ne, Twista, Pusha T, Styles P, will.i.am, DJ Quik, Kool G Rap, N.O.R.E. & Chuck D.

Discography

Albums

Singles

Featured singles 
Members of the Federation have also appeared on many other songs by other Bay Area rappers, some of which received radio airplay locally. Their appearances are highlighted in bold.

References

External links
Federation's Official justRHYMES.com profile
Federation's Myspace Profile

Hip hop groups from California
Musical groups established in 2002
Musical groups from the San Francisco Bay Area
Virgin Records artists
Reprise Records artists
People from Fairfield, California
Rappers from the San Francisco Bay Area